Hebert, full name Hebert Medeiros dos Santos (born 23 May 1991) is a Brazilian professional footballer who plays as a centre back.

Club career 
Hebert kicked off his career with Vasco, but was loaned to Portuguese teams, and made 36 appearances with Trofense of Segunda Liga. Consequently, he was bought by Primeira Liga side Braga, where he failed to break into the first team.

On 17 January 2014, he joined Piast Gliwice on a six-month loan deal, only to make it permanent the following season.

On 2 July 2021, he returned to Portugal and signed with Casa Pia.

Personal life
He was born in abject poverty in Barra Mansa; his mother struggled with alcohol addiction and his absent father was described as a dangerous maniac.

References

External links 
 
 
 

1991 births
Sportspeople from Rio de Janeiro (state)
Living people
Association football defenders
Brazilian footballers
CR Vasco da Gama players
C.D. Trofense players
S.C. Braga players
S.C. Braga B players
Piast Gliwice players
JEF United Chiba players
Wisła Kraków players
Santa Cruz Futebol Clube players
Casa Pia A.C. players
Liga Portugal 2 players
Primeira Liga players
Ekstraklasa players
J2 League players
Campeonato Brasileiro Série C players
Brazilian expatriate footballers
Brazilian expatriate sportspeople in Portugal
Brazilian expatriate sportspeople in Poland
Brazilian expatriate sportspeople in Japan
Expatriate footballers in Portugal
Expatriate footballers in Poland
Expatriate footballers in Japan
People from Barra Mansa